John Lilly is a venture capitalist and former CEO of Mozilla. He currently serves on the board of directors of the Open Source Applications Foundation and Code for America. He earned his B.S. in computer systems engineering and M.S. in computer science from Stanford University.

Career

Reactivity 

Lilly co-founded and served the CTO for Reactivity, a start-up focused on consulting on technically difficult websites and incubating new companies. Cisco Systems bought Reactivity in 2007 for $135 million.

Mozilla 

Lilly was the chief executive officer of the Mozilla Corporation from 2008 to 2010. The corporation, a subsidiary of the Mozilla Foundation, coordinates development of open-source Mozilla Internet applications, including the Firefox web browser. Lilly, previously Mozilla's Chief Operating Officer, succeeded Mitchell Baker as CEO in January 2008.

In May 2010, Lilly announced he would step down as CEO. Lilly was succeeded by Gary Kovacs on November 8, 2010. Lilly left Mozilla's board of directors in March 2014, reportedly over the appointment of Brendan Eich as CEO.

Venture capital 

Lilly joined the venture capital firm Greylock Partners as a partner in 2011. His investments include Instagram, Dropbox, Tumblr, Quip, and MessageMe. Lilly left the firm in January 2019 to dedicate himself more to activism, explaining "it’s crystal clear that 2019 & 2020 are crucially important years — certainly the most important time in a generation, but maybe much longer than that."

References

Further reading

External links 

 John Lilly's Weblog

Mozilla people
Douglas MacArthur High School (San Antonio) alumni
Stanford University School of Engineering alumni
Living people
American chief executives of financial services companies
American technology chief executives
American chief operating officers
Open source advocates
Year of birth missing (living people)
21st-century American businesspeople